Ridgewood Township existed in Bergen County, New Jersey and was established on March 30, 1876, consisting of the easternmost third of what remained of Franklin Township, west of the Saddle River.

Ridgewood Township lasted a mere 18 years, before it was subdivided in 1894, at the peak of the "boroughitis" phenomenon that was sweeping through Bergen County at the time. Midland Park was incorporated as a borough on September 6, 1894, and also included portions of Franklin Township. Glen Rock was formed on September 12, 1894, and also included territory that had been part of Saddle River Township. The Village of Ridgewood was incorporated on November 20, 1894, replacing the municipal government of Ridgewood Township.

Notes

References 
"History of Bergen County, New Jersey, 1630-1923;" by "Westervelt, Frances A. (Frances Augusta), 1858-1942."
"Municipal Incorporations of the State of New Jersey (according to Counties)" prepared by the Division of Local Government, Department of the Treasury (New Jersey); December 1, 1958.

External links
Bergen County Townships and Municipalities

1876 establishments in New Jersey
1894 disestablishments in New Jersey
Populated places disestablished in 1894
Populated places established in 1876
Former townships in Bergen County, New Jersey